Baie-Comeau Water Aerodrome  is located on the Manicouagan River, Quebec, Canada and is open from May until October.

The airport is classified as an airport of entry by Nav Canada and is staffed by the Canada Border Services Agency (CBSA). CBSA officers at this airport can handle general aviation aircraft only, with no more than 15 passengers.

See also
Baie-Comeau Airport
Baie-Comeau (Manic 1) Airport

References

Buildings and structures in Baie-Comeau
Registered aerodromes in Côte-Nord
Seaplane bases in Quebec